Stadła  (before 1964 Stadło) is a village in the administrative district of Gmina Podegrodzie, within Nowy Sącz County, Lesser Poland Voivodeship, in southern Poland.

The village was first mentioned in 1469. In 1788 German-speaking Lutheran settled here in the course of Josephine colonization. They built a church that became a religious centre for Lutherans living in other nearby Josephine colonies.

References

Villages in Nowy Sącz County